The follicle-stimulating hormone receptor or FSH receptor (FSHR) is a transmembrane receptor that interacts with the follicle-stimulating hormone (FSH)  and represents a G protein-coupled receptor (GPCR). Its activation is necessary for the hormonal functioning of FSH. FSHRs are found in the ovary, testis, and uterus.

FSHR gene 

The gene for the FSHR is found on chromosome 2 p21 in humans. The gene sequence of the FSHR consists of  about 2,080 nucleotides.

Receptor structure 

The FSHR consists of 695 amino acids and has a molecular mass of about 76 kDa. Like other GPCRs, the FSH-receptor possesses seven membrane-spanning domains or transmembrane helices.

 The extracellular domain of the receptor contains 11 leucine-rich repeats and is glycosylated.  It has two subdomains, a hormone-binding subdomain followed by a signal-specificity subdomain.  The hormone-binding subdomain is responsible for the high-affinity hormone binding, and the signal-specificity subdomain, containing a sulfated tyrosine at position 335 (sTyr) in a hinge loop, is required for the hormone activity.
 The transmembrane domain contains two highly conserved cysteine residues that build disulfide bonds to stabilize the receptor structure. A highly conserved Asp-Arg-Tyr triplet motif is present in GPCR family members in general and may be of importance to transmit the signal. In FSHR and its closely related other glycoprotein hormone receptor members (LHR and TSHR), this conserved triplet motif is a variation Glu-Arg-Trp sequence.
 The C-terminal domain is intracellular and brief, rich in serine and threonine residues for possible phosphorylation.

Ligand binding and signal transduction 

Upon initial binding to the LRR region of FSHR, FSH reshapes its conformation to form a new pocket. FSHR then inserts its sulfotyrosine from the hinge loop  into the pockets and activates the 7-helical transmembrane domain.  This event leads to a transduction of the signal that activates the G protein that is bound to the receptor internally. With FSH  attached, the receptor shifts conformation and, thus, mechanically activates the G protein, which detaches from the receptor and activates the cAMP system.

It is believed that a receptor molecule exists in a conformational equilibrium between active and inactive states. The binding of FSH to the receptor shifts the equilibrium between active and inactive receptors. FSH and FSH-agonists shift the equilibrium in favor of active states; FSH antagonists shift the equilibrium in favor of inactive states. For a cell to respond to FSH, only a small percentage (~1%) of receptor sites need to be activated.

Phosphorylation by cAMP-dependent protein kinases 

Cyclic AMP-dependent protein kinases (protein kinase A) are activated by the signal chain coming from the G protein (that was activated by the FSH-receptor) via adenylate cyclase and cyclic AMP (cAMP). 

These protein kinases are present as tetramers with two regulatory units and two catalytic units. Upon binding of  cAMP to the regulatory units, the catalytic units are released and initiate the phosphorylation of proteins, leading to the physiologic action. The cyclic AMP-regulatory dimers are degraded by phosphodiesterase and release 5’AMP. DNA  in the cell nucleus  binds to phosphorylated proteins through the cyclic AMP response element (CRE), which results in the activation of genes.

The signal is amplified by the involvement of cAMP and the resulting phosphorylation. The process is modified by prostaglandins. Other cellular regulators are participate are the intracellular calcium concentration modified by phospholipase, nitric acid, and other growth factors.

The FSH receptor can also activate the extracellular signal-regulated kinases (ERK). In a feedback mechanism, these activated kinases phosphorylate the receptor. The longer the receptor remains active, the more kinases are activated, the more receptors are phosphorylated.

Action 

In the ovary, the FSH receptor is necessary for follicular development and expressed on the granulosa cells.

In the male, the FSH receptor has been identified on the Sertoli cells that are critical for spermatogenesis.

The FSHR is expressed during the luteal phase in the secretory endometrium of the uterus.

FSH receptor is selectively expressed on the surface of the blood vessels of a wide range of carcinogenic tumors.

Receptor regulation

Upregulation 

Upregulation refers to the increase in the number of receptor sites on the membrane. Estrogen upregulates FSH receptor sites. In turn, FSH stimulates granulosa cells to produce estrogens. This synergistic activity of estrogen and FSH allows for follicle growth and development in the ovary.

Desensitization 

The FSHR become desensitized when exposed to FSH  for some time.  A key reaction of this downregulation is the phosphorylation of the intracellular (or cytoplasmic) receptor domain by protein kinases. This process uncouples Gs protein from the FSHR. Another way to desensitize is to uncouple the regulatory and catalytic units of the cAMP system.

Downregulation 

Downregulation refers to the decrease in the number of receptor sites. This can be accomplished by metabolizing bound FSHR sites. The bound FSH-receptor complex is brought by lateral migration to a "coated pit," where such units are concentrated  and then stabilized by a framework of clathrins.  A pinched-off coated pit is internalized and degraded by lysosomes. Proteins may be metabolized or the receptor can be recycled. Use of long-acting agonists will downregulate the receptor population.

Modulators 

Antibodies to FSHR can interfere with FSHR activity.

FSH abnormalities 

Some patients with ovarian hyperstimulation syndrome may have mutations in the gene for FSHR, making them more sensitive to gonadotropin stimulation.

Women with 46 XX gonadal dysgenesis  experience primary amenorrhea with hypergonadotropic hypogonadism. There are forms of 46 xx gonadal dysgenesis  wherein abnormalities  in the FSH-receptor have been reported and are thought to be the cause of the hypogonadism.

Polymorphism may affect FSH receptor populations and lead to poorer responses in infertile women receiving FSH medication for IVF.

Alternative splicing of the FSHR gene may be implicated in subfertility in males

Ligands 
Follicle-stimulating hormone (FSH) is an agonist of the FSHR.

Small-molecule positive allosteric modulators of the FSHR have been developed.

History 

Alfred G. Gilman  and Martin Rodbell received the 1994 Nobel Prize in Medicine and Physiology for the discovery of the G Protein System.

See also 
Luteinizing hormone/choriogonadotropin receptor

References

Further reading

External links 
 
 SSFA-GPHR: Sequence Structure Function Analysis of Glycoprotein Hormone Receptors
 GRIS: Glycoprotein-hormone Receptor Information System

G protein-coupled receptors
Gonadotropin-releasing hormone and gonadotropins
Signal transduction
LRR proteins
Human female endocrine system